Prigor is a commune in Caraș-Severin County, western Romania with a population of 2,978 people. It is composed of five villages: Borlovenii Noi (Újborlovény), Borlovenii Vechi (Óborlovény), Pătaș (Nérapatas), Prigor and Putna.

Natives
 Anton Golopenția

References

Communes in Caraș-Severin County
Localities in Romanian Banat